Al Kameen (الكمين Arabic, meaning "The Ambush") is a 2021 Emirati action-war film directed by Pierre Morel and written by Brandon Birtell and Kurtis Birtell.  The film is based on the true story of a 2018 ambush of Emirati soldiers by insurgents.  As of December 2021, it is highest grossing Emirati and Arabic-language film ever in the UAE.

Principal photography took place in the United Arab Emirates.  The film was released on November 25, 2021.  It is produced by AGC Studios and Image Nation Abu Dhabi and theatrically distributed by Vox Distribution.

Plot 
2018, during the Yemen War, United Arab Emirates Armed Forces soldiers based in Mocha are deployed on a mission. In the middle of a routine patrol, Emirati soldiers Ali Al-mismari, Bilal Al Saadi, and Al Hindasi are trapped in a valley by rebel combatants. In response, another squad of Emirati soldiers conducts a mission to rescue their compatriots.

Cast

Production
Harry Gregson-Williams composed the film’s musical score.  Drone filming was provided by Airscope Drones.

Al Kameen was filmed by a 400-member crew and cast, making it the largest Arabic-language feature film production filmed in the Gulf Cooperation Council (GCC).  The film crew included a team of Emirati filmmakers and cultural consultants, including directors Hana Kazim, Talal Al Asmani, Aliwiya Thani and Alia AlQemzi.  It was produced by AGC Studios and Image Nation Abu Dhabi.

Release
The film opened on November 25, 2021 in UAE and became the biggest opening of 2021 and highest-grossing Emirati and Arabic-language film ever in the UAE.

References

External links 
 

2020s Arabic-language films
Emirati drama films
Films directed by Pierre Morel
Films scored by Harry Gregson-Williams
2021 war drama films
2021 action films
2020s French films